Richard Thomas Merrick (January 28, 1828 – June 23, 1885) was a lawyer and Democratic political figure.

Born in Charles County, Maryland, Merrick was the son of William D. Merrick, a member of the Maryland legislature and the United States Senate.  His brother, William Matthews Merrick, was a federal judge and congressman from Maryland. His uncle, William Matthews, was the President of Georgetown College. At the age of eighteen, Merrick raised a company of dragoons for service in the Mexican–American War, becomng part of the 3rd U.S. Dragoons. On his return from Mexico, he began to practice law and was elected to the Maryland Legislature.  He later moved to Chicago and represented Illinois at the 1860 Democratic National Convention as a delegate for Stephen Douglas.

In 1864, he married Nannie McGuire and moved to Washington, D.C. where he became a successful attorney. He defended John Surratt against allegations that he was involved in Abraham Lincoln's assassination, and later represented Samuel J. Tilden at the Electoral Commission of 1877. In 1874, he endowed the Merrick Medal, a prize given annually to the best debater of the Philodemic Society of Georgetown University. He assisted in the prosecution of the star route scandal from 1882 to 1883.

Among those he served as counsel to was Lorenzo Thomas.

On April 16, 1868, Merrick testified in the impeachment trial of President Andrew Johnson, having been called as a witness by Johnson's defense team.

Merrick died on June 23, 1885 and was buried at Oak Hill Cemetery in Georgetown, Washington, D.C. His daughter, Mary Virginia Merrick, was the founder of the National Christ Child Society and is a candidate for canonization.

References

Sources
 

1828 births
1885 deaths
People from Charles County, Maryland
Maryland lawyers
Illinois Democrats
Washington, D.C., Democrats
Democratic Party members of the Maryland House of Delegates
19th-century American lawyers
19th-century American politicians
American military personnel of the Mexican–American War
Testifying witnesses of the impeachment trial of Andrew Johnson
Burials at Oak Hill Cemetery (Washington, D.C.)